Nicolas Sébastien Anelka (born 14 March 1979) is a French professional football manager and retired player who played as a forward. As a player, he regularly featured in his country's national team, often scoring at crucial moments. Known for his ability to both score and assist goals, he has been described as a classy and quick player, with good aerial ability, technique, shooting, and movement off the ball, and was capable of playing both as a main striker and as a second striker.

Anelka began his career at Paris Saint-Germain, but soon moved to Arsenal. He became a first team regular and won the PFA Young Player of the Year Award the following season. He moved to Real Madrid for £22.3 million in 1999, but did not settle in well and returned to PSG in a £20 million deal. Despite regular first team football in Paris, Anelka set his eyes upon the Premier League once more, moving on loan to Liverpool in January 2002, but joining Manchester City for £13 million at the start of the 2002–03 season.

After three seasons in Manchester, he moved to Turkish club Fenerbahçe for two seasons, before returning to England to join Bolton Wanderers in deals worth £7 million and £8 million respectively. He was then transferred to Chelsea from Bolton for a reported £15 million in January 2008. In 2009, he won the Premier League Golden Boot award as the league's top goalscorer. During his transfers over the years, he has built an aggregate transfer cost of just under £90 million. On 12 December 2011, Shanghai Shenhua announced that they had reached an agreement with Anelka to join the team in the winter transfer window. After one season there, Anelka joined Italian side Juventus on a six-month loan deal in 2013, after which he was released from Shanghai and signed for West Bromwich Albion on a free transfer. Following his dismissal by West Brom, he signed for Mumbai City FC as a marquee player and was named player-manager in 2015.

Anelka played 69 times at international level and won his first international honours with France at UEFA Euro 2000, and won the 2001 FIFA Confederations Cup the following year. His failure to settle at club level limited his international appearances, but he returned to the national team for Euro 2008. On 19 June 2010, he was excluded by the French Football Federation (FFF) from the 2010 World Cup in South Africa for "comments directed against the national coach, Raymond Domenech, unacceptable to the FFF, French football, and the principles they uphold". Two months later, having failed to turn up to his disciplinary hearing, he was banned for France's next 18 matches by the FFF, effectively ending his international career. Anelka later claimed to be "dying with laughter" at the 18-match ban, as he had already decided to retire from international play.

Early and personal life
Anelka was born in Le Chesnay, Yvelines, to parents who had moved  from Martinique in 1974. Thereafter, they settled in Trappes, near Paris. His childhood friends from Trappes include the actors Omar Sy and Jamel Debbouze. His mother is a secretary in the local high school.

Anelka is married to Barbara Tausia, a Belgian choreographer. Together, they have two sons, Kais, born in 2008, and Kahil, born in 2010. He acted in the 2002 film Le Boulet as a footballer named Nicolas. He has said that when he retires from football, he would like to work in the film industry because he has a friend in the business. He said, "I have a friend who's a producer, who makes lots of films. He recently did Astérix. So it's already agreed that I'm going to do other films. It helps to know actors and producers. It's different to football and it's something I enjoy very much because there's no ball. I like pretending to be somebody else, it's fun."

Anelka has two brothers, Claude and Didier.

After discussing religion with some childhood friends, Anelka converted to Islam in 2004 in the United Arab Emirates, taking the Muslim name of "Abdul-Salam Bilal". Anelka has said that he initially fasted during daylight hours as is required for the Muslim month of Ramadan, but "I realised I often got injured just after the period of Ramadan, so I don't observe it strictly any more". Initially, Anelka considered leaving European football to play in the UAE: "I am ready to stay here and to play for a club in the Emirates. I am not keen to go back to England or France." However, this did not come to pass and he briefly moved to Turkey instead, as well as three more English clubs.

Anelka is also known for his controversial relationship with French comedian Dieudonné M'bala M'bala and attracted widespread condemnation after performing the quenelle hand gesture, created by M'bala and regarded as anti-Semitic, on the pitch when playing for West Bromwich Albion in 2013. Anelka responded that the gesture was anti-establishment, not anti-Semitic. An FA disciplinary hearing nonetheless banned Anelka for five matches, but found that he was not anti-Semitic and had not intended the gesture to express or promote anti-Semitism. After West Brom suspended him pending their own investigation, Anelka was given notice of termination of his contract by the club due to the club and player being unable to come to terms over the conditions required for the suspension by the club to be lifted, as well as comments made by Anelka on Twitter. In 2020, Anelka said the quenelle was only a protest against his former manager Steve Clarke, who is not Jewish.

Anelka has been the subject of the 2012 Canal+ documentary L'Entrée des Trappistes about his friendship with Sy and Debbouze, and the feature-length 2020 Netflix documentary Anelka: Misunderstood.

Club career

Paris Saint-Germain
Anelka began his career at Paris Saint-Germain as a youth player at age 16.

Arsenal
In February 1997, at age 17, Anelka joined Premier League club Arsenal for a £500,000 transfer fee under newly appointed manager Arsène Wenger. The transfer caused controversy in France as Arsenal sought to sign him for free under the precedent of the recent Bosman ruling, despite there being exceptions for players under the age of 24; Wenger said this age restriction was only for domestic transfers.

His first team opportunities were limited in the 1996–97 season, but in 1997–98, he broke into the first team after a long-term injury to striker Ian Wright. In November 1997, Anelka scored his first goal for Arsenal in a 3–2 home win against Manchester United. Anelka was a key player in Arsenal's Double win of both the Premier League and FA Cup that season. Anelka scored the second goal in Arsenal's 2–0 win over Newcastle United in that season's FA Cup final.

Anelka was Arsenal's top scorer in the 1998–99 season with 17 Premier League goals. This form saw him voted the PFA Young Player of the Year, but Arsenal failed to defend their Premier League and FA Cup titles and made little progress in the UEFA Champions League. Fans turned on the striker amid transfer speculation and a perceived lack of enthusiasm, giving him the nickname "Le Sulk". During the close season, Anelka stated a desire to leave Arsenal, claiming the British press was responsible for his unhappiness in England. On 2 August 1999, he joined Real Madrid.

With regard to his time with the Gunners, Anelka later said he believes he should have never left Arsenal, a club that he has great "love" for. Of his former boss at Highbury, Arsène Wenger, Anelka is a huge admirer and a strong supporter of him. Anelka also placed at 29th in the club's compilation of the 50 Greatest Gunners of all-time. In all, he made 90 appearances for Arsenal, scoring 28 goals altogether for the club.

Real Madrid
In the summer of 1999, Anelka moved to Real Madrid for a £22.3 million transfer fee. He took time to score for the club; on a visit to the football tabloid Marca he played a FIFA game with the staff, who then released the mocking front-page headline "Anelka finally scores a goal...on a video game". He failed to score for Real Madrid in his first five months at the club, eventually recording his first goal in the opening match of the FIFA Club World Championship against Al-Nassr on 5 January 2000. Two days later, he scored twice against Corinthians in the same competition, also missing an 81st-minute penalty kick that would have given him a hat-trick.

On 28 February 2000, Anelka scored his first La Liga goal in a 3–0 defeat of rivals Barcelona in El Clásico at the Santiago Bernabéu Stadium. However, in March, he was suspended by club president Lorenzo Sanz after refusing to train, because of a disagreement with head coach Vicente del Bosque. After returning to the team, Anelka scored in both legs of the Champions League semi-final to give Los Blancos a 3–2 aggregate victory over Bayern Munich and advance to the competition final. He started in the final, held at the Stade de France in his home city of Paris, as Real Madrid ran out 3–0 winners over Valencia to win an eighth European Cup.

Return to Paris-Saint Germain
Anelka signed a six-year professional contract at Paris Saint-Germain in July 2000, a return to the club at which he used to play as a youth player, in a transfer deal worth £22 million. The Paris club had finished second in Ligue 1 that season, thereby qualifying for the 2000–01 UEFA Champions League. Anelka's return was met with much fanfare. Canal Plus, which owned Paris Saint-Germain, financed the transfer, while PSG sponsor Nike covered much of Anelka's compensation of £30–35,000 per week.

Anelka started well and was appointed captain of a team that was briefly at the top of 2000–01 French Division 1, but the team's form quickly dropped. In December 2000, following a 5–1 loss to Sedan, Philippe Bergeroo was replaced as PSG manager by Luis Fernández. PSG finished ninth in Ligue 1 that season, earning a place in next season's UEFA Intertoto Cup. PSG finished second in the first round of group stage, behind Bayern Munich, but finished bottom of the second group stage, behind Deportivo de La Coruña, Galatasaray and Milan.

However, once again, Anelka developed issues with his head coach, Luis Fernández (who was already under pressure for benching Ronaldinho due to his work ethic).

Liverpool (loan)
After two-and-a-half years, Anelka returned to the Premier League in December 2001 to join Liverpool on a short-term loan deal until the end of the season. He contributed to Liverpool's late push to come second in the 2001–02 FA Premier League, scoring goals against Everton,
Fulham, Blackburn Rovers, Ipswich Town, and in the 2001–02 FA Cup against Birmingham City, but manager Gérard Houllier opted not to offer him a permanent deal after the end of the season in favour of signing Senegalese forward El Hadji Diouf.

Manchester City
Anelka joined Manchester City on 24 May 2002, with the £13 million transfer fee paid by manager Kevin Keegan, then a club record high. In his first season at City, Anelka was the club's top scorer with 14 goals, including a goal in the last ever Manchester Derby at Maine Road against Manchester United, against former club Arsenal and a last minute winner at Anfield after scoring a penalty just moments earlier. In his second season at City, he finished top scorer again, in the club's first season at the City of Manchester Stadium, with 25 goals. On 16 October 2004, he won and scored a penalty against Chelsea, which led to José Mourinho's first defeat as Chelsea manager.

Fenerbahçe
In January 2005, Manchester City announced Anelka had completed a £7 million transfer to Turkish team Fenerbahçe. He helped the Turkish club win the Süper Lig title in 2005, and played with them in the UEFA Cup that season, as well as the UEFA Champions League the season after.

Bolton Wanderers
On 25 August 2006, Bolton Wanderers signed Anelka on a four-year deal for a club record transfer fee of £8 million. He made his debut for Bolton against Watford on 9 September 2006. He opened his account on 19 September in a League Cup match against Walsall, scoring the last goal of a 3–1 away win. After 11 matches without a goal in the Premier League, he scored his first goals – a brace – on 25 November to help down Arsenal 3–1. He finished the 2006–07 Premier League season as Bolton's top scorer with eleven goals.

In January 2007, Anelka stated he would be willing to leave Bolton for a return to former club Arsenal. However, he pledged his future to Bolton in July 2007 following talks with manager Sammy Lee. Anelka later said he would reluctantly consider leaving the club if Bolton's poor start to the 2007–08 season continued, but later signed a new four-year contract lasting until 2011 on 30 August. In June 2020 Anelka admitted he signed the contract so that Bolton could get a bigger transfer fee when he left.

Chelsea
On 11 January 2008, it was confirmed Anelka would join Chelsea for £15 million. He made his Chelsea debut against Tottenham Hotspur on 12 January 2008, and scored his first goal two weeks later in the FA Cup against Wigan Athletic. He scored his first league goal on 2 February against Portsmouth, but failed to score again for Chelsea during the 2007–08 season.

In the 2008 Champions League final, Anelka delivered Chelsea's seventh penalty which was saved by Edwin van der Sar, resulting in Manchester United winning the competition. Anelka later blamed manager Avram Grant for his penalty miss, claiming Grant brought him on to play as a late substitute without a proper warm up beforehand and also too late in the game to acclimatize himself in it.

On 3 August 2008, Anelka scored four goals in a 5–0 friendly win against Milan.

With Didier Drogba injured at the beginning of the 2008–09 season, Anelka made a very impressive start to the campaign. His goalscoring spree won him the Golden Boot Award on 14 November 2008 for being the first player that season to score ten Premier League goals. Anelka scored his first competitive hat-trick for Chelsea against Sunderland, in a 5–0 home win on 1 November 2008, and followed this up with two braces against Blackburn Rovers, then West Bromwich Albion. He established himself as an important member of the squad and maintained his place in the team despite the return to fitness of Drogba. After the arrival of Guus Hiddink, Anelka was more often played on the wing. Furthermore, he was ranked among the top goalscorers in the league for the season. He scored another hat-trick against Watford in the FA Cup to earn Chelsea a 3–1 victory at Vicarage Road. On 10 May, he scored one goal and set up another in a 4–1 away win against former club Arsenal. Anelka did not celebrate the goal which he scored in the game, as he disclosed "he still loved Arsenal". A goal in Chelsea's final Premier League game of the season at Sunderland put him as top goal scorer for the season in the Premier League, earning him the Golden Boot with 19 goals.

Anelka scored his first goal of the 2009–10 season against West London rivals Fulham in a 2–0 win at Craven Cottage, before continuing his fine form with the opening goal in Chelsea's 3–0 win over Burnley the following weekend. He scored his third goal of the season in the opening match of the 2009–10 Champions League group stage in the 1–0 victory over Porto. Anelka scored one of the best goals of his season against APOEL in the Champions League with the ball being passed into the net from outside the box. Anelka scored his third league goal of the season against Liverpool at Stamford Bridge in a 2–0 win with the second goal coming from compatriot Florent Malouda. Anelka continued his fine scoring run in the Champions League with the winner in the 1–0 victory over Porto at the Estádio do Dragão, making Chelsea only the second ever English side to win at Porto's home ground. He continued his scoring in the season by scoring Chelsea's first goal in a 3–3 draw against Everton in the Premier League, his first goal in the competition since October. He followed that up with another goal in Chelsea's 2–1 victory over Portsmouth.

On 16 January 2010, on his return from injury, Anelka scored twice in an astonishing 7–2 victory over Sunderland. He continued this fine form into the next match scoring in an FA Cup tie against Preston North End, bringing his tally in the previous four matches to five goals. After the return of Didier Drogba from the African Cup of Nations, Anelka had been playing on the wing to support him. Anelka scored his first goal since January in a 1–0 win over his former club Bolton in April 2010, putting Chelsea four points ahead of second-place Manchester United. On the final day of the season, Anelka scored two goals against Wigan Athletic, including the first Chelsea goal in the sixth minute, to help Chelsea win their third Premier League title and their first in four years. Anelka (along with Ashley Cole) joined Henning Berg in the exclusive band of players who have won the Premier League title with two different clubs. On 24 June 2010, Chelsea announced Anelka had signed a new one-year extension to his existing contract that will keep him at the club until 2012.

Anelka started the 2010–11 campaign in fine form for Chelsea. He assisted Florent Malouda's last goal against West Brom on the opening day of the Premier League season, scored a double in the next game against Wigan Athletic, then won a penalty against Stoke City in Chelsea's third game of the season. He continued this fine form in Chelsea's first Champions League match, scoring a first half brace against MŠK Žilina. Further goals against Marseille and Spartak Moscow ensured this was the first season since playing for Paris Saint-Germain he had scored at least four goals in a Champions League season. On 19 October, during Chelsea's Champions League group stage match against Spartak, Anelka continued his impressive goal scoring form in the Champions League, scoring the second goal of the match and his 50th goal for Chelsea in the 43rd minute of the game. He ended the 2010–11 season with 16 goals from 45 appearances in all competitions.

Anelka scored Chelsea's first goal of the 2011–12 season against West Brom in a 2–1 Premier League victory. This would prove to be Anelka's final goal for Chelsea, however, as he failed to find the net in 14 further appearances in 2011. On 3 December 2011, after Chelsea's 3–0 victory against Newcastle United, manager André Villas-Boas confirmed to the media that Anelka, along with centre-back Alex, had submitted transfer requests to the club and would be free to leave Chelsea in January. On 12 December, Chelsea confirmed Anelka would join Chinese club Shanghai Shenhua. Zhu Jun, owner of Shanghai Shenhua, confirmed his club had sealed a deal with Anelka in his Weibo on 12 December 2011. This deal was later officially announced by both clubs and was finalized the same day.

In total, Anelka scored 59 goals for Chelsea in 184 appearances.

Shanghai Shenhua

On 1 January 2012, Anelka moved to Chinese club Shanghai Shenhua, with his annual salary reported to be around €12 million. Following his move, Anelka revealed he turned down the chance to join his former club PSG the previous month in favour of signing for Shanghai Shenhua, and explained that his move was because he did not have attractive offers to remain within Europe. On 21 February 2012, he scored his debut goal in a pre-season friendly match against Hunan Billows, just 40 seconds after the start of the match. Anelka failed to make his Chinese Super League (CSL) debut due to ankle injury on the opening league match of the season against Jiangsu Sainty. He eventually made his CSL debut and scored his first CSL goal on 16 March 2012, in a 3–2 away defeat against bitter rivals Beijing Guoan. On 11 April 2012, Anelka was named as part of the coaching staff to help struggling manager Jean Tigana.

On 19 June 2012, it was confirmed that Anelka's former Chelsea teammate Didier Drogba would join Shanghai Shenhua. On 7 June 2012, it was claimed Anelka was keen on a move back to the Premier League after he was involved in a heated exchange with a fan for refusing to bow in front of the travelling Shenhua fans with his teammates. Anelka provided two assists for Drogba and headed in a late equaliser to earn Shenhua a point in a 3–3 draw with Shandong Luneng Taishan on 25 August.

Juventus (loan)
On 26 January 2013, Anelka joined Italian side Juventus on a five-month loan deal. He made his debut for Juventus against Celtic in the Champions League. Anelka made two further appearances for Juventus, both in Serie A, as the club won the league title.

West Bromwich Albion
On 4 July 2013, Anelka joined West Bromwich Albion on a free transfer after being released by Shanghai Shenhua, marking another return to the Premier League, the sixth Premier League club he has played for in his career. He said he would like to end his career in England, at West Brom. On 22 August 2013, Anelka reportedly walked out of a training session telling staff he was leaving the club to retire. The reports were quickly denied by the club, which confirmed Anelka would miss one match and that he had left the session early on compassionate grounds following the death of his agent. On 28 August 2013, it was announced that since completing his week of compassionate leave, Anelka had decided to remain with the club and would begin training the following day in preparation for West Brom's forthcoming match against Swansea City. He subsequently returned full-time to the team.

Anelka scored his first goal for the club in a 3–3 draw with West Ham United on 28 December 2013, scoring a first-half brace in his first appearance in over two months. During his goal celebration he performed a quenelle, a hand gesture popularized by his comedian friend Dieudonné, described by some critics as an inverted Nazi salute. The Football Association (FA) and anti-racism organisations investigated the incident following allegations of anti-Semitism. On 27 February 2014, an FA disciplinary hearing banned Anelka for five matches, fined him £80,000 and ordered him to complete an educational course. In the hearing, the FA disciplinary hearing panel concluded, "[W]e did not find that Nicolas Anelka is an anti-Semite or that he intended to express or promote anti-Semitism by his use of the quenelle." Anelka and the FA both decided not to appeal this verdict. In the 2020 documentary Anelka: Misunderstood, Anelka said that the quenelle was only a protest at former West Brom manager Steve Clarke, who is not Jewish.

Anelka used social media to announce he was terminating his contract with West Brom. West Brom responded that Anelka had given the club no official notification of his intention to leave, and later gave him 14 days notice of termination from the club for gross misconduct.

Mumbai City FC 
On 15 September 2014, Anelka joined Mumbai City of the newly formed Indian Super League. Following a three-match global ban, he made his debut on 28 October 2014 in a 5–1 defeat at Chennaiyin FC. Five days later, in his first home match at the DY Patil Stadium, Anelka scored the match's only goal to defeat Kerala Blasters. On 5 November, he scored his only other goal of the season, for a home game of the same outcome against the Delhi Dynamos. Anelka played a total of seven matches for Mumbai, as they finished seventh and did not qualify for the end-of-season play-offs.

In January 2015, Anelka had agreed a deal to join Algerian side NA Hussein Dey on an 18-month contract. However, the move was blocked by the Algerian Football Federation as, "Only those aged under 27 and playing on the international level for their countries are allowed to sign up with our clubs." Anelka subsequently returned to Mumbai and was named the team's player-manager on 3 July 2015.

International career

At youth level, Anelka played for the French under-20 team at the 1997 World Youth Championship, and made his senior team debut for France in a goalless draw with Sweden national team on 22 April 1998. Anelka was not selected for the 1998 FIFA World Cup-winning squad, but quickly became France's first choice centre forward during the UEFA Euro 2000 qualifying campaign, scoring the opening goal in France's 3–2 win over Russia on his first international start and scoring both goals in a comfortable 2–0 win over England at Wembley Stadium in February 1999. Anelka made his first appearance in a major tournament at Euro 2000, which France went on to win. He also formed part of the squad which won the 2001 FIFA Confederations Cup, where he scored his only tournament goal in a 5–0 win over hosts South Korea in the opening game. In November 2002, he rejected an emergency call-up by Jacques Santini to face Serbia and Montenegro and was barred by the manager; in February 2004 he eyed a return for the UEFA Euro 2004 squad as Djibril Cissé was suspended.

In November 2005, now under, Raymond Domenech, Anelka returned to the France squad for a friendly against Costa Rica in Martinique. The match in the homeland of Anelka's parents was the team's first in the French Caribbean. He scored in the 3–2 win. When Cissé was forced out of 2006 World Cup due to injury, Lyon striker Sidney Govou was called up as Cissé's replacement rather than Anelka.

Anelka came on as a substitute in the Euro 2008 qualifier against Lithuania on 24 March 2007, and scored the only goal in a 1–0 victory. Following his performance, Anelka was praised by France manager Raymond Domenech: "It is the Nicolas I like to see... when he shows these qualities, he is a candidate for a permanent place." He also scored in the 2–0 victory against Ukraine on 2 June 2007.

Anelka featured in the France squad for Euro 2008 in Austria and Switzerland. Anelka started France's first group game against Romania, but was substituted after 72 minutes. He did not start either of France's remaining two games in the tournament against the Netherlands and Italy, coming on as a substitute in both games.

Anelka played a key role in France's 2010 World Cup playoff against the Republic of Ireland. He scored the winning goal in the 72nd minute that put France in a good position with one away goal.

During the 2010 World Cup, Anelka was sent home after reportedly abusing coach Raymond Domenech at half-time during the 2–0 defeat to Mexico. Following criticism of his positioning by Domenech, Anelka is reported to have said, "," meaning, "Go fuck yourself, you dirty son of a whore." The incident was later reported by the media, and the player refused to publicly apologise when asked to do so by French Football Federation (FFF) president Jean-Pierre Escalettes. The next day, the squad refused to go to training in protest against Anelka's expulsion. Anelka was subsequently given an 18-game suspension from international football by the FFF as punishment for his actions, effectively ending his international career. Anelka later claimed to be "dying with laughter" at the 18-match ban, as he had already decided to retire from international play.

Anelka took L'Équipe to court for their front page, demanding €150,000 in compensation. He lost the case as he only denied the wording of the insult that was attributed to him, and not the fact that he made an insult. In a 2018 documentary, Domenech said that Anelka only insulted his management, not him as a person or his mother.

Retirement
After retiring as a player, Anelka joined the technical staff of Dutch Eredivisie side Roda JC in February 2017, claiming he wanted to help his friend and the club's shareholder Aleksey Korotaev. In November 2018, he joined Lille as a youth forwards coach. On 3 February 2021 he became the sports director of Hyères FC, under the new ownership of Mourad Boudjellal. He departed three months later, on 4 May 2021, with no first team game taking place during his tenure due to the COVID-19 pandemic in France.

Career statistics

Club

International

Scores and results list France's goal tally first, score column indicates score after each Anelka goal.

Honours
Arsenal
Premier League: 1997–98
FA Cup: 1997–98
FA Charity Shield: 1998

Real Madrid
UEFA Champions League: 1999–2000

Paris Saint-Germain
UEFA Intertoto Cup: 2001

Fenerbahçe
Süper Lig: 2004–05

Chelsea
Premier League: 2009–10
FA Cup: 2008–09, 2009–10
FA Community Shield: 2009
Football League Cup runner-up: 2007–08
UEFA Champions League runner-up: 2007–08

Juventus
Serie A: 2012–13

France U18
UEFA European Under-18 Championship: 1997

France
UEFA European Championship: 2000
FIFA Confederations Cup: 2001

Individual
Division 1 Rookie of the Year: 1998
Premier League Player of the Month: February 1999, November 2008
PFA Young Player of the Year: 1998–99
PFA Team of the Year: 1998–99 Premier League, 2008–09 Premier League
Premier League Golden Boot: 2008–09

References

External links

 
 
 
 

1979 births
Living people
French people of Martiniquais descent
People from Le Chesnay
People from Trappes
Converts to Islam
French Muslims
Black French sportspeople
Footballers from Yvelines
French footballers
Association football forwards
INF Clairefontaine players
Paris Saint-Germain F.C. players
Arsenal F.C. players
Real Madrid CF players
Liverpool F.C. players
Manchester City F.C. players
Fenerbahçe S.K. footballers
Bolton Wanderers F.C. players
Chelsea F.C. players
Shanghai Shenhua F.C. players
Juventus F.C. players
West Bromwich Albion F.C. players
Mumbai City FC players
Ligue 1 players
Premier League players
La Liga players
Süper Lig players
Serie A players
Chinese Super League players
Indian Super League players
Indian Super League marquee players
First Division/Premier League top scorers
UEFA Champions League winning players
France youth international footballers
France under-21 international footballers
France international footballers
UEFA Euro 2000 players
2001 FIFA Confederations Cup players
UEFA Euro 2008 players
2010 FIFA World Cup players
UEFA European Championship-winning players
FIFA Confederations Cup-winning players
French expatriate footballers
French expatriate sportspeople in England
French expatriate sportspeople in Spain
French expatriate sportspeople in Turkey
French expatriate sportspeople in China
French expatriate sportspeople in Italy
French expatriate sportspeople in India
Expatriate footballers in England
Expatriate footballers in Spain
Expatriate footballers in Turkey
Expatriate footballers in China
Expatriate footballers in Italy
Expatriate footballers in India
French football managers
Lille OSC non-playing staff
Mumbai City FC head coaches
Indian Super League head coaches
French expatriate football managers
Expatriate football managers in India
Association football coaches
Mumbai City FC managers
FA Cup Final players